Greedy is the final album released in 1997 by New Zealand band Headless Chickens.

Track listing
"Dark Angel" (Chris Matthews, Grant Fell, Bevan Sweeney, Angus McNaughton) – 4:03
"Stalk of a Cherry" (Matthews, Fell) – 3:17
"Secondtime Virgin" (Matthews, Bevan Larsen, Sweeney) – 4:54
"Cipher" (Matthews, Larsen) – 3:05
"Magnet" (Matthews, Larsen) – 4:32
"Fire" (Matthews, Michael Lawry) – 4:35
"Electricity" (Matthews, Larsen) – 4:35
"Chicken Little" (Matthews, Larsen) – 5:51
"Smoking Big Ted" (Matthews, Fell, Lawry) – 2:39
"Black Water Rising" (Matthews, Fell, McNaughton) – 4:30
"Escalator" (Matthews, Fell, Sweeney, McNaughton, Fiona McDonald) – 4:53
"Day of the Locust" – 5:39
"George" – 4:11

Personnel

Chris Matthews – vocals, guitars, samples, loops, keyboards
Bevan Larsen – bass guitar
Bevan Sweeney – drums
Grant Fell – bass ("Chicken Little", "Smoking Big Ted", "George")
Angus McNaughton – samples, loops ("Dark Angel", "Chicken Little", "Smoking Big Ted", "Black Water Rising", "Day of the Locust")
Fiona McDonald – vocals ("George"), backing vocals ("Electricity", "Escalator")
Flex (aka Simon Claridge) – additional samples ("Secondtime Virgin", "Chicken Little")
Rachel Wallis – backing vocals ("Stalk of a Cherry", "Magnet")

Headless Chickens albums
1997 albums